The Blattbach is a tributary of the Helmbach, roughly  long, in the Palatinate Forest in the German state of Rhineland-Palatinate. It rises in the central part of the forest and flows eastwards before discharging into the Helmbach. The Blattbach is located entirely within the territory of the municipality of Elmstein.

Tributaries 
Miedersbach (right),

References 

Elmstein
Rivers of Rhineland-Palatinate
Palatinate Forest
Rivers of Germany